Time Out is an Australian television series which aired 1963 on Sydney station ATN-7. 

The 10-minute series aired after the ATN-7 evening news (which aired in a 20-minute time-slot), and consisted of TV and stage actors portraying Australian historical figures, who were "interviewed" by a faux-interviewer played by actor Alistair Duncan. 26 episodes were produced.

It had a spin-off titled Tribunal.

References

External links
Time Out on IMDb

1963 Australian television series debuts
1963 Australian television series endings
Black-and-white Australian television shows
English-language television shows